Ravindra Prasad Patnaik is an Indian music composer, singer, actor, screenwriter and film director who works in Telugu, Kannada and Tamil. He won three Filmfare Awards and three Nandi Awards.

He has toured the world to perform his live shows.

Patnaik had entered the film industry with a desire to become a film director, and began first as a music director with the movie Neekosam. Cinematographer-turned-director Teja gave him a break with Chitram, that Patnaik made his directorial debut with the 2008 film Andamaina Manasulo. As of March 2016, he finished his sixth Telugu language film Manalo Okadu. His brother Gautam Patnaik is a director who made his directorial debut with Keratam (2011).

Career
Patnaik received the Filmfare Award three times consecutively for the films Nuvvu Nenu, Santosham and Excuse Me, and apart from receiving the Andhra Pradesh state Nandi Award for the film Nuvvu Nenu in 2001, he has won awards from different cultural organisations in and outside the state and country for his music. His film Mnalo Okadu received Third Best Feature Film award for 2016 Nandi Awards.

As a singer, apart from singing in his own composition, he has sung for almost all the lead composers including Ilayaraja and has sung about 300 songs.

He composed an international album, first of its kind in the world, on time signatures called Chaakra the Signature of Time which he applied for Grammy Awards.

He has introduced many singers including Ranjith, Mallikarjun, Ravivarma, Nihal, and Kousalya.

Patnaik had done his Bachelors of science in Rayagada Autonomous College, Rayagada, Odisha. He has a post graduate degree in space physics from Andhra University.

Actor

Apart from music, he made his acting debut in the 2004 Telugu film named Seenu Vasanthi Lakshmi in which he played a blind singer and got a very good applause for his outstanding performance and in 2010 he acted in Broker.

Patnaik's first directed film was the experimental short 22 minutes, in which the entire 22-minute film is a single scene and edge-of-the-seat screenplay. The experiment is the characters which are seen don't speak and the characters which are heard not seen.

He acted, produced, directed, composed music for the 2016 film Tulasi Dalam. In 2016 after getting huge positive response from the public for his Directorial movie Broker on Corruption, He dared to question media's Ego and its ignorance in collecting their News with his movie Manalo Okadu.

Director

Following upon his work as a music composer and music director, Patnaik began directing films, and has directed 6 feature films till date. In 2008, he directed his first film, Andamaina Manasulo, a musical love story of a 13-year-old girl falling in love with a 21-year boy and with a message on how should be an ideal orphanage. His second released film in December 2010 was Broker, about political brokers, the film was shortlisted for final race in the National Awards. Both these released films had him receive two Nandi awards for Best Story Writer for the years 2008 and 2010.

In 2012, he directed a film, titled Friends Book in Telugu, about the strength of social network.

In 2013, he directed a supernatural thriller film in 2013 titled Amy. The film is set in a different backdrop in the USA about Amish community.

In 2016, he produced and directed a film named Tulasi Dalam, for which he composed 5 songs and has also acted.

In 2016, he Directed and Acted in movie Manalo Okadu.

Filmography

Film director

 Andamaina Manasulo (2008)
 Broker (2010)
 Friends Book (2012)
 Amy (2013)
 Tulasi Dalam (2016)
 Vyuha (Kannada) (Under Production)
 Manalo Okkadu (2016)

Actor
 Seenu Vasanthi Lakshmi (2004) as Seenu
 Andamaina Manasulo (2008) as Doctor
 Broker (2010) as Ganapathi
 Tulasi Dalam (2016) as Dr.Tilak
 Manalo Okkadu (2016) as Physics Lecturer Krishnamurthy

Music director

Telugu

 Nee Kosam (1999) 
 Chitram (2000)
 Subhavela (2000) 
 Family Circus (2001)
 Nuvvu Nenu (2001)
 Ramma Chilakamma (2001) 
 9 Nelalu (2001)
 Manasantha Nuvve (2001)
 Nuvvu Leka Nenu Lenu (2002)
 Santosham 
 Sreeram (2002)
 Allari Ramudu (2002)
 Indra (2002) [one song only]
 Jayam (2002)
 Holi (2002)
 Gemini (2002)
 Nee Sneham (2002)
 Eeshwar (2002)
 Yuva Rathna (2002) [one song only]
 Dil (2003)
 Sambaram (2003)
 Nijam (2003)
 Ninne Ishtapaddanu (2003)
 Neeku Nenu Naaku Nuvvu (2003)
 Appudappudu (2003)
 Aa Naluguru (2004)
 Seenu Vasanthi Lakshmi (2004)
 Avunanna Kaadanna (2005)
 Maa Iddari Madhya (2006)
 Bommalata (2006)
 Lakshmi Kalyanam (2007)
 Swagatam (2008)
 Naa Manasukemaindi (2008)
 Swagatam (2008)
 Andamaina Manasulo (2008)
 Vaade Kavali (2009)
 Nenu Tanu Aame (2010)
 Broker (2010)
 Virodhi (2011)
 Friends Book (2012)
 Prabhanjanam (2014)
 Tulasi Dalam (2016)
 Manalo Okkadu (2016)
 Ahimsa (2022)

Tamil

 Jayam (2003)
 Pazhaniappa Kalloori (2007)
 Naan Aval Adhu (Unreleased film)

Kannada
Excuse Me (2003)
Chappale (2004 film) (2004)
Jootata (2005)
Inspector Dayanayak (2005)
Aakash (2005)
Siddu (2005)
Honeymoon Express (2006)
Student (2006)
Dattha (2006)
Uppi Dada M.B.B.S. (2006)
Odahuttidavalu (2006)
Tenali Rama (2006)
Ee Preethi Yeke Bhoomi Melide (2006)
Savi Savi Nenapu (2007)
Police Story 2 (2007)
Ugadi (2007)
Kshana Kshana (2007)
Vamshi (2008)

Hindi
Kuch Tum Kaho Kuch Hum Kahein (2002) (Background score only)
Yeh Dil (2002) (Background score only)

Singer
"Nanna Kattukaro", "Neelam Neelam" - Family Circus
"Gaajuvaka Pilla" - Nuvvu Nenu
"Priyathama" - Jeyam
"Kavithaiye Theriyuma" - Jeyam (Tamil)
"Veyi Kannulatho" - nee sneham

Awards and nominations
 Filmfare Awards South
 2001, Best Music Director – Telugu - Nuvvu Nenu
 2002, Best Music Director – Telugu - Santosham
 2003, Best Music Director – Kannada - Excuse Me

 Nandi Awards
 2001, Best Music Director - Nuvvu Nenu
 2008, Best Story Writer - Andamaina Manasulo
 2010, Best Story Writer - Broker
2016, Nandi Award for Best Third Feature film - "Manalo Okkadu"

References

External links 
 

Living people
Tamil film score composers
Kannada film score composers
Telugu film score composers
Filmfare Awards South winners
Telugu playback singers
Indian male playback singers
Indian male composers
21st-century Indian film directors
Tamil film directors
Male actors in Telugu cinema
Film directors from Andhra Pradesh
Musicians from Andhra Pradesh
21st-century Indian composers
1972 births
Male film score composers
21st-century Indian male singers
21st-century Indian singers